Serge Legendre is a research scientist in the field of paleobiology with the Institute of Paleoenvironment & PaleoBiosphere, University of Lyon and editor-in-chief of Geobios, a scientific journal published bi-monthly.

Publications
Correlation of carnassial tooth size and body weight in recent carnivores (mammalia), in association with Claudia Roth.
Using cenograms to investigate gaps in mammalian body mass distributions in Australian mammals (2009). Library Network of Western Switzerland.
Spatial and temporal variation in European Neogene large mammals diversity (2009).
Mammalian Communities Document a Latitudinal Environmental Gradient during the Miocene Climatic Optimum in Western Europe (2008) LNWS.

References

French paleontologists
Living people
Year of birth missing (living people)